Niecki may refer to the following places:
Niecki, Łódź Voivodeship (central Poland)
Niecki, Masovian Voivodeship (east-central Poland)
Niecki, Podlaskie Voivodeship (north-east Poland)